The Peter Peterson House is located in Ephraim, Wisconsin.

History
Peter Peterson was a Norwegian immigrant. He would become a prominent merchant and politician and would help to found a local Lutheran church. Originally his private residence, Peterson eventually donated the house to the church. Since then, it has been used as a parsonage. The building is commonly known as the Bethany Lutheran Parsonage.

It was listed on the National Register of Historic Places in 1985 and on the State Register of Historic Places in 1989.

References

Properties of religious function on the National Register of Historic Places in Wisconsin
Houses on the National Register of Historic Places in Wisconsin
National Register of Historic Places in Door County, Wisconsin
Clergy houses in the United States
Houses in Door County, Wisconsin
Houses completed in 1874